is a run and gun video game from Game Arts, originally released for the NEC PC-8801 in 1985. It was ported to many systems, including the Famicom.

Gameplay 

In Thexder, the player controls a fighter robot that is able to transform into a jet and shoot lasers.

Release 
The game was originally released in 1985 for the NEC PC-8801 platform in Japan. Game Arts licensed Thexder to Square in order to develop a conversion for the Nintendo Entertainment System (NES) game console. In 1987, Game Arts also developed a Thexder conversion for the MSX platform. The game was licensed to Sierra Entertainment for release in the United States. In 1987, Sierra ported the game to multiple platforms, including the IBM PC, Tandy Color Computer 3, Apple II, Apple IIGS, Apple Macintosh, and Tandy 1000. In 1988, Activision released the game in Europe on the Commodore Amiga.

Reception 
Thexder quickly became a best-selling hit, selling over 500,000 copies in Japan by 1987. The PC-8801 platform was only popular in Japan and, despite home market success, Thexder garnered little attention abroad initially. With the conversion for the MSX (the best-selling platform in Brazil and many Eastern European countries), it became an international hit. It became the company's best-selling title of 1987. By 1990, the game had sold over one million copies worldwide. 

Compute! praised the Apple IIGS version of Thexder as the computer's "first true arcade game" with "excellent play value for your dollar". In 1988, The Games Machine gave the Amiga version a 74% score. In 1991, Dragon gave the Macintosh and PC/MS-DOS versions of the game each 4 out of 5 stars. The game went on to sell over one million copies worldwide, becoming Game Arts' biggest-selling title of 1987. Thexder is considered an important breakthrough title for the run-and-gun shooter game genre, paving the way for titles such as Contra and Metal Slug.

Other games in the series

References

External links 
 

Thexder
 Official website (D4Enterprise/Project Egg)
 
 
 Thexder Apple IIGS manual

Thexder 95
 

1985 video games
Amiga games
Apple II games
Apple IIGS games
DOS games
FM-7 games
Game Arts games
GungHo Online Entertainment franchises
Classic Mac OS games
MSX games
NEC PC-8801 games
NEC PC-9801 games
Nintendo Entertainment System games
Run and gun games
Science fiction video games
Single-player video games
Sierra Entertainment games
Square (video game company) games
TRS-80 Color Computer games
PlayStation Portable games
PlayStation Network games
PlayStation 3 games
Video games about robots
Sharp MZ games
Sharp X1 games
Video game franchises
Video games developed in Japan
Synergistic Software games